Navarin  Airfield is a World War II military airfield in Algeria, located approximately 10 km from El Eulma in Sétif Province. It was used by the United States Army Air Force Twelfth Air Force during the North African Campaign for heavy B-17 Flying Fortress bombers against the German Afrika Korps. B-17s known as the 'Diamondbacks' would fly from here to Rome in Operation Husky in July 1943. Known units assigned were:

 2d Bombardment Group, 22–27 April 1943, B-17 Flying Fortress
 99th Bombardment Group, 22 February-25 March 1943, B-17 Flying Fortress

When the Americans moved east into Tunisia, the airfield was dismantled and abandoned.  Traces of its runway may be visible on satellite imagery, however a lack of detailed aerial photography of the area limits determining a precise location and current condition of the airfield.

See also
 Boeing B-17 Flying Fortress airfields in the Mediterranean Theater of Operations

References

 Maurer, Maurer. Air Force Combat Units of World War II. Maxwell AFB, Alabama: Office of Air Force History, 1983. .
 
 USAFHRA search for Navarin Airfield

External links

Airfields of the United States Army Air Forces in Algeria
Airports established in 1942
1942 establishments in Algeria